Sehan University is a private university located in Yeongam County, South Jeolla, South Korea.  The current president is Lee Gyeong-sue (이경수), who has led the university since its founding in 1994.

Academics

Six colleges oversee the university's undergraduate offerings:  Teacher Training, Art and Physical Education, Public Health, Engineering, Police and Fire, and Humanities.  There is a general graduate school, offering graduate training in many of these fields, and specialized graduate schools of Industrial Technology, Business Administration, Social Welfare, Public Health, and Education.

History

The school opened in 1994 as Daebul Industrial College (대불공과대학).  It became a university the following year.

Notable people 
Seo In-guk, actor and singer
Yoon Kyun-sang, actor and model

See also
List of colleges and universities in South Korea
Education in South Korea

External links
Official school website, in Korean and Chinese

Universities and colleges in South Jeolla Province
1994 establishments in South Korea
Educational institutions established in 1994